The 1933 Purdue Boilermakers football team was an American football team that represented Purdue University during the 1933 Big Ten Conference football season.  In their fourth season under head coach Noble Kizer, the Boilermakers compiled a 6–1–1 record, finished in third place in the Big Ten Conference with a 3–1–1 record against conference opponents, and outscored opponents by a total of 109 to 37. The team lost to Iowa (6–14) and tied with Minnesota (7–7). Dutch Fehring was the team's captain.

Schedule

References

Purdue
Purdue Boilermakers football seasons
Purdue Boilermakers football